The  is the 9th edition of the Japan Film Professional Awards. It awarded the best of 1999 in film. The ceremony took place on April 8, 2000 at Theatre Shinjuku in Tokyo.

Awards 
Best Film: Don't Look Back
Best Director: Yuji Nakae (Nabbie's Love)
Best Actress: Takami Yoshimoto (Minazuki)
Best Actor: Hidetoshi Nishijima (Ningen Gōkaku)
Best New Encouragement: Tsugumi (Moonlight Whispers)
Best New Director: Akihiko Shiota (Don't Look Back, Moonlight Whispers)
Special: Riki Takeuchi (Dead or Alive, Blood Rōketsu, Hōfuku Revenge Gekijōban)
Special: Shirō Sasaki (For production of Nabbie's Love.)

10 best films
 Don't Look Back (Akihiko Shiota)
 Nabbie's Love (Yuji Nakae)
 Dead or Alive (Takashi Miike)
 Ningen Gōkaku (Kiyoshi Kurosawa)
 Moonlight Whispers (Akihiko Shiota)
 Nihon Kuro Shakai (Takashi Miike)
 Office Lady Love Juice (Yūji Tajiri)
 M/Other (Nobuhiro Suwa)
 Shark Skin Man and Peach Hip Girl (Katsuhito Ishii)
 Adrenaline Drive (Shinobu Yaguchi)

References

External links
  

Japan Film Professional Awards
2000 in Japanese cinema
Japan Film Professional Awards
April 2000 events in Japan